Treatment of chronic fatigue syndrome (CFS) is variable and uncertain, and the condition is primarily managed rather than cured.

Only two treatments, cognitive behavioral therapy (CBT) and graded exercise therapy (GET), have demonstrated reproducible evidence for their efficacy in people with CFS who are walking. Based on evidence from multiple randomized clinical trials (RCTs), a systematic review published in the Journal of the Royal Society of Medicine (October 2006) stated that CBT and GET interventions showed promising results, appearing to reduce symptoms and improve function. The review stated that the evidence of effectiveness was inconclusive for most other interventions, with some reporting significant adverse effects. The wide variety of outcome measures used in CFS research was found to be a "fundamental problem" for assessing the effectiveness of interventions in general, and no intervention has proven to be effective in restoring the ability to work.

There are no Food and Drug Administration (FDA) approved medications for ME/CFS treatment, although medications are used without approval for the illness (off-label). Drugs have been used in experimental studies of the illness that haven't been approved for market for any condition in the United States (for example, isoprinosine and rintatolimod). Other proposed treatments include medical treatments and alternative medicine. Rintatolimod has been approved for import and use in Argentina.

Even when treated, the prognosis of CFS is often poor. Recovery is "rare" even after a comprehensive rehabilitation programme.

Pacing
Pacing (activity management) is a management strategy rather than a therapy. Pacing encourages behavioral change, but unlike cognitive behavioural therapy, acknowledge the typical patient fluctuations in symptom severity and experience delayed exercise recovery. Pacing does not require patients to increase their activity levels unless they feel able to do so. Patients are advised to set manageable daily activity/exercise goals and balance their activity and rest to avoid possible over-doing which may worsen their symptoms. A small randomised controlled trial concluded pacing with GET had statistically better results than relaxation/flexibility therapy. A 2008 patient survey by Action for ME found pacing to be the most helpful treatment and a 2009 survey of two Norwegian patient organizations (ME-association and MENiN) had found that 96% evaluated pacing as useful. In 2019, a large UK found that pacing led to greater improvements in patients' physical health, although a minority did report becoming worse.

Energy envelope theory
Energy Envelope Theory is a form of pacing that states patients should aim to stay within their 'envelope' of available energy, and by avoiding exceeding their energy levels the worsening of symptoms after mental and physical exertion (post-exertional malaise) should reduce, allowing for "modest" gains in functioning as a result. Energy envelope theory is considered to be consistent with pacing, and is a management strategy suggested in the 2011 international consensus criteria for ME, which refers to using an "energy bank budget". Energy Envelope Theory was first described in 1999. Several studies have found energy envelope theory to be a helpful management strategy for CFS, noting that it reduces symptoms and may increase functioning. Energy envelope theory does not recommend unilaterally increasing or decreasing activity and is not intended as a therapy or cure for CFS.

Energy Envelope Theory has been promoted by various patient groups.

Pacing with a heart rate monitor
Some patient groups recommend pacing using a heart rate monitor to increase awareness of exertion, and to allow patients to stay within their aerobic threshold envelope. Randomized controlled trials of pacing using a heart rate monitor are lacking.

Spoon theory
Spoon theory is a way of understanding activity management in chronic illness and is based on the idea that each patient has a limited number of "spoons", with each spoon representing their available energy. A healthy person has an unlimited amount of available energy each day, but a person with chronic illness has a limited amount and must choose which activities to do. Spoon theory is commonly used by people with CFS.

Adaptive Pacing Therapy
Adaptive Pacing Therapy (APT) is a treatment target than a management strategy and should not be confused with pacing. APT states that a person with CFS should aim to gradually increase their level of activity over time, but must not exceed more than 70% of what they feel is their available energy.

Cognitive behavioral therapy
According to the cognitive-behavioural model of CFS, it is the patient's interpretation of symptoms that primarily shapes their behaviour and perpetuates the illness, and that changing these can lead to complete recovery. Cognitive behavioral therapy (CBT) based on this model attempts to reverse patients' symptoms by altering their interpretation of their symptoms and/or the behaviours they engage in as a result. CBT can be applied to CFS in other ways too. For example, it may be used help the patient cope with their disability by better management of rest and activity within the boundaries of the energy constraints of the disorder, and does not actively attempt to improve the patient's physical or psychological capacity. This type of intervention does not necessarily assume the symptoms originate from maladaptive illness beliefs. The CDC currently suggests supportive counseling may be helpful in coping with the impact of the illness, but does not directly suggest CBT.

A 2011 systematic review of randomized controlled trial RCTs found that CBT for CFS had moderate evidence of benefit for some patients, but that the effectiveness of CBT for CFS outside of specialist settings has been questioned and the quality of the evidence is low. However, in 2016 the full data for the larger trial involving CBT was released, which showed CBT did not result in any significant improvement in walking distance or employment. A 2002 Cochrane review of CBT concluded, "CBT is more effective than usual care for reducing fatigue symptoms in adults with CFS, with 40% of participants assigned to CBT showing clinical response at post-treatment, in comparison with 26% assigned to usual care control." However, it also stated that the benefits of CBT in sustaining clinical response at follow up are inconclusive, and there were no conclusive improvements to physical functioning, depression, anxiety or psychological distress at either post treatment or later follow-up. Data on adverse effects were not systematically presented by any included study. The review also concluded that, while the quantity and quality of the evidence has grown in recent years, "there is a surprising lack of high quality evidence on the effectiveness of CBT alone or in combination with other treatments to inform the development of clinical management programmes for people with CFS". For example, other therapies were used as attention placebo control groups, which limits confidence in the findings.

A 2007 meta-analysis found that the effectiveness of CBT depends on the diagnostic criteria used, with studies using the Oxford criteria having a trend towards significantly higher effect sizes that those using the CDC criteria. The review also notes that CBT for chronic fatigue disorders has about the same efficacy as diverse psychological treatments for a variety of psychological disorders. In 2015, an ARHQ review recommended the Oxford criteria be retired due to the likelihood of wrongly classifying many patients with other conditions as having CFS. In 2016, an ARHQ addendum downgraded the evidence for CBT and stated it should not be used as a primary treatment.

A 2010 meta-analysis of trials that objectively measured physical activity before and after CBT showed that although CBT effectively reduced patients' fatigue questionnaire scores, activity levels were not improved by CBT and changes in physical activity were not related to changes in fatigue questionnaire scores. They conclude that the effect of CBT on fatigue questionnaire scores is not mediated by a change in physical activity. According to the authors of a 2014 systematic review, the lack of changes to objectively measured physical activity contradict the cognitive behavioural model of CFS and suggest that patients still avoided postexertional symptom exacerbations and adapted to the illness rather than recovered from it.

Currently there is no research into the effectiveness of CBT for the severely affected, and these patients may be effectively excluded from trials due to the need to attend a clinic. Some CBT trials have large dropout rates, up to 42% in one study, with a mean dropout rate of 16%. This compares to a 17% dropout rate in a trial of 432 patients receiving CBT for anxiety, "so is not unusually high" according to a 2007 meta-analysis.

CBT has been criticised by patients' organisations because of negative reports from many of their members which have indicated that CBT can sometimes make people worse, a common result across multiple patient surveys. One such survey conducted by Action for ME in 2001 found that out of the 285 participants who reported using CBT, 7% reported it to be helpful, 67% reported no change, and 26% reported that it made their condition worse. A large survey commissioned in the UK by NICE for the guidelines review found that CBT for CFS was not effective for more than half of people with CFS, and patients were more likely to get worse physically than to improve.

Group CBT
Group CBT is not recommended by the CDC or by the Dutch Health Council. A systematic study conducted at the behest of the Belgian government of over 800 CFS patients treated in four reference centers which tested CBT and GET in a clinical setting concluded that although patient motivation for treatment seemed to be high and that in 71% the supervising team considered the patient to have reached their maximal capacity, "No patient had been cured. Therapy provided systematically included CBT and GET. After treatment duration of 41 to 62 hours of rehabilitation per patient of which 83% group based, spread over 6 to 12 months, patients' subjective feelings of fatigue were improved, but results concerning quality of life were equivocal. Psychological problems or psychiatric co-morbidities improved, but still fell outside the range of healthy adults. Physical capacity did not change; employment status decreased at the end of the therapy." The report noted that "It is difficult however, to judge these results, since no control group had been included."

A 2002 Cochrane systematic review updated on 2008 included four studies which used group CBT and concluded that it was less effective than individual CBT at reducing fatigue at post-treatment. A 2007 meta-analysis stated that the one included study which tested group CBT had produced a similar effect to the other studies using individual CBT. In a more recent study of a multidisciplinary intervention which combined group CBT and GET with pharmacological treatment, at 12 months after completion this intervention was "slightly inferior" to usual care alone, resulting in no improvements to fatigue or health-related quality of life, and worse physical function and bodily pain scores. Some CFS patients have comorbid depression and/or anxiety. Children have been successfully treated using antidepressants and therapy.

Graded exercise therapy

A 2019 Cochrane review found that people with CFS who performed exercises may feel less fatigued, there is positive effect of exercise on sleep, physical function and self perceived general health, although no outcomes were conclusive for pain, quality of life, depression. Effects obtained with exercises were greater than pacing but similar to those obtained with CBT. A 2012 systematic review concluded that despite the consistent positive outcomes of exercise therapy studies for CFS, "exercise therapy is not a cure for CFS", and "full recovery from CFS is rare".

A 2015 Cochrane systematic review included five eligible studies on GET and found statistically significant improvements to self-reported fatigue severity and physical functioning. This benefit was sustained after 6 months but became non-significant compared to the control group who did not receive GET. Functional work capacity was not significantly improved. GET had a tendency towards higher dropout rates, and although there was no evidence that exercise therapy worsened outcomes on average, no data was reported for adverse effects. The authors state that the evidence base and the precision of the results are limited, and encourage higher quality studies "that involve different patient groups and settings, and that measure additional outcomes such as adverse effects, quality of life and cost effectiveness over longer periods of time".

Pragmatic rehabilitation
Pragmatic rehabilitation is "a programme of gradually increasing activity designed collaboratively by the patient and the therapist". In response to an earlier successful trial, a larger trial was conducted, known as Fatigue Intervention by Nurses Evaluation. In the FINE trial, patients fulfilling Oxford 1991 CFS criteria who were allocated to pragmatic rehabilitation reported a statistically significant but "clinically modest" improvement in fatigue when compared to patients allocated to either "supportive listening" or "treatment as usual", but after 12 months follow-up there were no statistically significant differences. There was no significant improvement to physical functioning at any time. About 10% of the trial participants were non-ambulatory and about 30% met London ME criteria, but separate results for these groups were not published. In an accompanying editorial, possible reasons are given for why the earlier success was not replicated in this trial, and further research is encouraged; the patients in this trial had higher comorbidity and disability than patients in the earlier trial or most other trials, and received less sessions than most successful trials of CBT and GET. The question was also raised whether generalists are as successful as specialists in offering behavioural interventions.

Placebo response
A meta-analysis conducted in 2005 examined the incidence of study-defined improvement within various control groups used in CFS intervention studies. The study reported a pooled improvement rate of 19.6%. However, this figure included a number of studies where the control conditions were passive or unblinded, and therefore participants would not have any expectation of improvement. Therefore, it is by no means a direct measure of the "placebo response".

Recovery
A 2014 systematic review reported that estimates of recovery from CFS ranged between 0 and 66% in intervention studies and from 2.6 to 62% in naturalistic studies. There was a lack of consensus in the literature on how recovery should be defined, with almost all of the 22 included studies measuring recovery differently. Recovery was operationally defined by reference to, either alone or in combination: fatigue or related symptoms; function; premorbid function; and/or brief global assessment (which was the most common outcome measure, but does not provide information on symptoms and function, and does not "provide assurance that patients have substantially recovered rather than simply improved"). Focusing on only fatigue or function may overestimate recovery rates, because patients may show selective rather than overall change. A patient with reduced self-reported fatigue may still experience functional disruptions, pain, sleep disturbances, or malaise. "Recovery" in the reviewed studies was often based on limited assessments, less than a full restoration of health, and self-reports with a general lack of more objective measures. In the absence of definitive measures, recovery criteria should set high but reasonable standards for behavioural recovery which approach restoration of pre-morbid health. When objective measures are used, such as the relatively objective behavioural measure of actigraphy, the results have been contrary to the cognitive behavioural model of CFS which predicts increased physical functioning as a result of intervention, as otherwise 'successful' trials did not find significant changes in physical activity. The authors state "a more modest interpretation of 'recovery' might characterize such outcomes as successful adaptation of illness-related behaviour and attitudes to ongoing but perhaps diminished illness", "improved or recovered patients may have continued to avoid activity levels that provoked debilitating postexertional symptom flare-ups", which "would seem to be more consistent with a hypothesis of successful adaptation rather than recovery". It was concluded that more precise and accurate labels other than "recovery" (e.g. clinically significant improvement) may be more appropriate and informative for the improvements reported in previous research, and in keeping with commonly understood conceptions of recovery from illness, recommended a consistent definition of recovery that "captures a broad-based return to health with assessments of both fatigue and function as well as the patient's perceptions of his/her recovery status" and "the recovery time following physical and mental exertion".

A 2012 systematic review on exercise therapy for CFS reported that exercise therapy is not a cure for CFS. The authors stated that "Despite the consistent positive outcomes of exercise therapy studies for CFS, full recovery from CFS is rare. In addition, exercise therapy is not a sole treatment for people with CFS. A comprehensive treatment for CFS  of education of the aetiology and pathophysiology of the illness, stress management, cognitive restructuring, sleep hygiene and GET together with graded activity. But even such a comprehensive rehabilitation programme only rarely results in full recovery."

Research

Pharmaceuticals
No pharmacological treatments have been established as a cure for CFS, but various drugs are used to manage the symptoms of CFS.

In subsets of patients, various viruses and bacteria have been reported as the causative agents of CFS, although consistent and compelling supportive evidence is still lacking. A number of antiviral and antibacterial treatment studies have been conducted with inconsistent results. More research and treatment studies of subtypes of CFS are needed to reduce the inconsistencies.

Rintatolimod
Nucleic acid (double-stranded RNA) compounds represent a potential new class of pharmaceutical products that are designed to act at the molecular level, it is an inducer of interferon and is considered to be antiviral and immunomodulatory.

One RCT evaluated rintatolimod and found an overall beneficial effect. In December 2009 the U.S. Food and Drug Administration (FDA) refused to approve a New Drug Application (NDA) by the developer of the drug (Hemispherx Biopharma) to market and sell Ampligen for treatment of CFS. The FDA concluded that the two RCTs submitted "did not provide credible evidence of efficacy."

Hemispherx Biopharma performed additional analyses on their data and submitted a new NDA to the FDA in 2012. After reviewing the data, the FDA did not approve the application citing "insufficient safety and efficacy data".

Rintatolimod has achieved statistically significant improvements in primary endpoints in Phase II and Phase III double-blind, randomized, placebo-controlled clinical trials with a generally well tolerated safety profile and supported by open-label trials in the United States and Europe.

Rintatolimod has been approved for marketing and treatment for persons with CFS in Argentina, and in 2019 the U.S. FDA regulatory requirements were met for exportation of rintatolimod from the United States to Argentina.

Valacyclovir
Nucleosidic class drugs such as acyclovir, valacyclovir and ganciclovir are inhibitors of viral replication during DNA (for DNA- and retroviruses) or RNA (for RNA viruses) multiplication.

A small 1988 RCT compared acyclovir against placebo and found that an equal proportion of patients improved from placebo and with active treatment. The authors concluded that the improvement reflected either spontaneous remission or the placebo effect.
Three people withdrew from acyclovir treatment due to reversible renal failure.

Antidepressants
Antidepressants are often prescribed to CFS patients. Their purpose can be to treat secondary depression or mood swings, but low dosage tricyclic antidepressants are sometimes prescribed to improve sleep quality and reduce pain.

The evidence for antidepressants is mixed and their use remains controversial. In a review of pharmacological treatments for CFS, five trials of antidepressants were included but only one of these reported a statistically significant improvement in symptoms and this effect was only observed in patients who received 12 weeks of CBT before starting treatment with mirtazapine.

Stimulants
Psychostimulants such as amphetamine, methylphenidate, and modafinil have been studied in the treatment of CFS.

Hormones
Treatment with steroids and thyroid hormones, such as hydrocortisone, fludrocortisone, and nasal flunisolide, has been studied.

The evidence for corticosteroids is limited. A 2006 systematic review examined RCTs of steroids, primarily hydrocortisone, which found one with a significant difference between groups for fatigue, but two other RCTs found no benefit for steroid treatment. The study which showed statistical significance was noted as scoring poorly for validity.

During a randomized, double-blind trial conducted between 1992 and 1996, hydrocortisone treatment (at a higher dose of 20–30 mg) was associated with some statistical improvement in symptoms of CFS. However, the authors concluded that the degree of adrenal suppression precludes its practical use for CFS. Additionally, long-term use of these medications carry risks of steroid-induced osteoporosis and muscle atrophy.

Fludrocortisone is commonly used for patients with postural orthostatic tachycardia syndrome (POTS) to treat orthostatic intolerance. Given the high comorbidity rate between CFS and POTS, it's possible that fludrocortisone could reduce symptoms in these patients. However, there is no research available which examines its effect on comorbid CFS and POTS.

NADH
There is no good evidence that NADH is of benefit for CFS patients.

Immunotherapy

Rituximab
A potential use for rituximab was identified by two Norwegian doctors who were treating people who had cancer with rituximab; two people also had chronic fatigue syndrome and the CFS improved. As of 2017 this use had been explored in some small clinical trials and was undergoing some larger ones; it was unclear as of 2017 whether there is enough benefit in light of the known adverse effects, for rituximab to be a viable treatment for CFS. Results from the 2-year randomized, placebo-controlled, double-blind, multicenter RituxME trial comparing multiple brands of rituximab infusions with placebo in 151 ME/CFS patients published online April 1, 2019, in Annals of Internal Medicine concluded that "B-cell depletion using several infusions of rituximab over 12 months was not associated with clinical improvement in patients with ME/CFS," and thirty-four patients had serious events. "

Staphylococcal toxoid vaccine
There have been two RCTs with staphylococcal toxoid vaccine. A small RCT showed considerable benefit and a large follow up RCT showed overall benefit. However the quality of the follow-up RCT was low and there were relatively high levels of adverse effects, although the increase in adverse effects in the treated patients compared to controls did not reach statistical significance. A 2006 review concluded that there is still insufficient evidence for immunological therapies of this type.

Interferon
A systematic review found two small RCTs that evaluated interferon.
One RCT found an overall beneficial effect and the other showed some positive effects in relation to immunological outcomes only. The quality of both of these studies was considered poor. A 2007 review of research needs for CFS concluded that trials for interferon beta are an important priority.

IgG
A systematic review found five RCTs to have assessed the effects of immunoglobulin treatment for CFS; of these, two RCTs showed an overall beneficial effect and two RCTs showed some positive results, although in one of the studies this was for physiological effects only. The largest of the RCTs found no effect for the treatment. Another review concluded that "Given the weak evidence of benefit for immunotherapy, the potential harms indicate that it should not be offered as a treatment for CFS."

Alternative medicine
People with CFS may use more alternative medicine treatments than people without CFS. In a twin study, 91% of twins with CFS and 71% without CFS used at least one alternative treatment. A large proportion of the study participants said alternative treatments were helpful.

Dietary supplements
A 2006 updated systematic review concluded that the supplements essential fatty acids and magnesium have shown beneficial effects but only in one or two trials and further rigorous trials of these interventions would be helpful. A 2008 review found insufficient evidence to recommend dietary supplements as a treatment in chronic fatigue syndrome. One RCT compared a polynutrient supplement (containing several vitamins, minerals, and coenzymes, taken twice daily) with a placebo for 10 weeks, but found no difference in fatigue scores.

Carnitine
L-Carnitine is an amino acid which includes ALC, a group of natural compounds that have an important role in cellular function. It is required for the transport of fatty acids into the mitochondria during the breakdown of lipids(or fats) for the generation of metabolic energy including in muscles and in the brain. Two RCTs found benefit from dietary supplementation with L-carnitine or its esters. A 2006 systematic review reported one RCT with overall benefit, although there was no placebo control.

In 2008 a randomised double-blind placebo-controlled six-month trial on 96 aged subjects with CFS symptoms administering Acetyl L-carnitine was reported. By the end of the treatment, significant differences between the two groups were found for both physical and mental fatigue and improvements in both the cognitive status and physical functions. A 2002 double‐blind randomized controlled trial with 53 patients found no difference in fatigue severity between groups when given a supplement containing 1200 mg carnitine.

Essential fatty acids
A randomized controlled trial on patients diagnosed with post viral fatigue syndrome (PVFS) and deficient RBC levels, using essential fatty acids consisting of evening primrose oil containing n-6 GLA together with fishoil concentrate containing n-3 EPA and DHA showed significant overall improvement in symptoms and RBC essential fatty acid levels. However a subsequent RCT trying to replicate this study found no significant differences between the treatment and placebo group after treatment, and no significant differences in pre-treatment red-cell membrane lipids between the two groups. The different results may be explained by the patient selection: the first trial tested people with PVFS, whereas the second used the Oxford criteria for CFS. Also, the first trial used paraffin while the second trial used sunflower oil which is better tolerated and less likely to adversely affect the placebo group.

Magnesium
Positive results from a trial of magnesium delivered by injection to magnesium-deficient CFS patients were published in 1991, but three subsequent studies did not find magnesium deficiency as a general problem in CFS patients. A 2008 review concluded that there is no good evidence that intramuscular magnesium is of benefit in CFS.

Vitamin B12
Both oral and injected vitamin B12 have been suggested as treatments for generalized fatigue since the 1950s, however recent studies do not suggest any benefit from it, either for generalized fatigue or CFS specifically. Further research is needed, however, as studies to date have been small and used inconsistent dosing regimens.

Controversy

PACE trial controversy
The PACE trial was a large-scale five-year trial funded by the UK government which compared the efficacy and safety of four treatments: specialist medical care (SMC), SMC with CBT, SMC with GET, and SMC with adaptive pacing therapy (APT). The results were published in February 2011 and showed that CBT and GET were, when combined with SMC, each "moderately" effective compared to SMC alone. APT was not found to be effective when added to SMC.

CBT was done on the basis of the fear avoidance theory of chronic fatigue syndrome. This theory regards CFS as being reversible and that cognitive responses (fear of engaging in activity) and behavioural responses (avoidance of activity) are linked and interact with physiological processes to perpetuate fatigue. The aim of treatment was to change the behavioural and cognitive factors assumed to be responsible for perpetuation of the participant's symptoms and disability.

Graded exercise therapy (GET) was done on the basis of deconditioning and exercise intolerance theories of chronic fatigue syndrome. These theories assume that CFS is perpetuated by reversible physiological changes of deconditioning and avoidance of activity; these changes result in the deconditioning being maintained and an increased perception of effort during exertion and increased symptoms after unaccustomed activity, leading to further inactivity. The aim of treatment was to help the participant gradually return to appropriate physical activities, reverse the deconditioning, and thereby reduce fatigue and disability.

641 patients meeting the Oxford criteria for CFS were recruited, and were assigned approximately evenly to the four treatment conditions. Two weeks after the commencement of the trial, self-reported fatigue scores were significantly lower and self-rated physical function scores significantly higher for the GET and CBT groups than for the SMC and APT groups. At 52 weeks post-treatment, average scores on a 6-minute walking distance test were significantly higher for the GET group than for the other groups. However, the mean distance walked (334 metres) was still well below the mean for healthy elderly people (631 metres). The CBT group did not perform significantly differently from the SMC and APT groups on this measure. A subsequent paper presented results from a step fitness test, but at 52 weeks, there were no significant differences in performance across groups on this measure.

The trial reported that CBT and GET were "safe". A serious adverse event was defined as either: death, life-threatening, hospitalisation, increased severe disability for at least 4 weeks duration, any episode of deliberate self-harm. Serious adverse reactions to the therapies were recorded in two (1%) of the 159 patients in the APT group, three (2%) of the 161 patients in the CBT group, 2 (1%) of the 160 patients in the GET group and two (1%) of the 160 patients in the SMC group.

A subsequent paper examined the proportion of patients who could be classified as recovered after the trial. A patient was considered recovered if they obtained a specified threshold score on the fatigue and physical function self-report scales, if they rated their health as "much better" or "very much better", and if they also failed to meet the authors' case definition of CFS. According to the primary measures of recovery reported in the paper, 22% recovered after CBT, 22% after GET, but only 8% after APT and 7% after SMC.

A follow-up conducted 2.5 years after the commencement of the trial reported no significant differences between the various treatment groups on the primary self-report measures. That is, the treatment-specific effects evident at 52 weeks were no longer evident at 2.5 years.

The publication of the trial results generated a vigorous response. Letters to the editor by some specialists and patient advocates expressed concern over generalisability of the results and questioned protocol changes during the course of the trial that resulted in some participants meeting criteria for "trial recovery" at baseline. The authors of the paper responded in a letter which stated that the protocol changes and other decisions were approved by the Trial Steering Committee. Patient groups expressed disappointment over news media interpreting the definition of "recovery to normal by trial criteria" as "cured". Professor Malcolm Hooper submitted complaints to the Medical Research Council and the Lancet . The MRC and the Lancet considered the submissions but rejected them. A Lancet editorial expressed suspicions of an active campaign to discredit the research."

Controversy has arisen from the authors' and the Lancet refusal to share data from the study; according to an article in Slate: "Starting in 2011, patients analyzing the study filed Freedom of Information Act requests to learn what the trial's results would have been under the original protocol. Those were denied along with many other requests about the trial, some on the grounds that the requests were 'vexatious.' The investigators said they considered the requests to be harassment. ... Richard Horton, the editor of the Lancet, defended the trial, calling the critics 'a fairly small, but highly organized, very vocal and very damaging group of individuals who have, I would say, actually hijacked this agenda and distorted the debate so that it actually harms the overwhelming majority of patients.'" In 2016, the PACE trial data were made publicly available after a ruling in the UK.

References

External links 
 Treatment of ME/CFS by the Centers for Disease Control and Prevention

Chronic fatigue syndrome